Two icebreakers have been named Vaygach:

  (1909–1918), a steam-powered icebreaker that sank in 1918
 , a nuclear-powered shallow draft icebreaker that entered service in 1990